Cravate club is a 2002 French comedy film about two architects sharing an office. The film features a scene where the characters perform a choreographed sequence using their office chairs.

References

External links

 https://web.archive.org/web/20101121141616/http://www.cravateclub.ca/

French comedy films
2000s French films

fr:Cravate club#Le film